In geometric graph theory, a convex embedding of a graph is an embedding of the graph into a Euclidean space, with its vertices represented as points and its edges as line segments, so that all of the vertices outside a specified subset belong to the convex hull of their neighbors. A convex embedding into -dimensional Euclidean space is said to be in general position if every subset  of its vertices spans a subspace of dimension .

Convex embeddings were introduced by W. T. Tutte in 1963. Tutte showed that if the outer face  of a planar graph is fixed to the shape of a given convex polygon in the plane, and the remaining vertices are placed by solving a system of linear equations describing the behavior of ideal springs on the edges of the graph, then the result will be a convex -embedding. More strongly, every face of an embedding constructed in this way will be a convex polygon, resulting in a convex drawing of the graph.

One-dimensional convex embeddings (in general position), for a specified set of two vertices, are equivalent to bipolar orientations of the given graph.

References

Geometric graph theory